Crome may refer to:

People
 August Friedrich Wilhelm Crome (1753–1833), German economist
 Georg Ernst Wilhelm Crome (1781–1813), German agricultural scientist; see Franz Körte
 John Crome (1768–1821), English painter and founder of the Norwich School of painters
 John Berney Crome (1768–1821), English painter
 Louise Crome, New Zealand squash player

Other
 Crome, former name of Chrome, California, a community in Glenn County

See also
 Chrome (disambiguation)